Botingoo is a village in the Zaingair area of Sopore in Baramulla District in the Indian union territory of Jammu and Kashmir.

References

Villages in Baramulla district